Aleksander Krupa (born 18 March 1947), often credited as Olek Krupa, is a Polish actor, active in film and television roles and best known for playing villains and/or criminals, such as in Eraser, Blue Streak, Home Alone 3 as Peter Beaupre and The Italian Job as Mashkov. He also notably portrayed a Bosnian Serb general engaged in genocide against Bosnian Muslims in 2001's Behind Enemy Lines and portrayed the President of Russia in 2010's action thriller film Salt. Krupa continued to have minor roles in many Hollywood movies, such as X-Men: First Class, Hidden Figures, and The Fate of the Furious.

Early life 
Krupa was born in Rybnik, Poland.

Career 
Krupa first appeared in a Documentary in 1984 Far from Poland. His first film debut was in the 1986 film 91/2 Weeks.

Personal life 
He married Noa Ain, a composer and painter. They have one child together named Julia Ain Krupa. After their divorce, they remained friends until her death in 2019.

Awards and nominations 
He was nominated for Gold Derby Awards in the category Ensemble Cast for his movie 'Hidden Figures' in 2017.

Filmography

Film

Television

References

External links
 

1947 births
Living people
20th-century Polish male actors
21st-century Polish male actors
Polish male film actors
Polish male television actors
People from Rybnik
Polish emigrants to the United States